Suk Hi Kim is the editor of North Korean Review and a senior professor of international finance at the University of Detroit Mercy in the United States. He is the founding editor of the Multinational Business Review .

Selected publications
 Economic Sanctions Against a Nuclear North Korea: An Analysis of United States and United Nations Actions Since 1950 (co-editor; McFarland, 2007)
 Global Corporate Finance (co-author; Wiley-Blackwell, 2006)
 Basics of Financial Management (co-author; Copley, 2004)
 North Korea at a Crossroads (McFarland, 2003)

See also
 Institute for North Korean Studies

External links
 About Suk Hi Kim, Korea-America Economic Association
 Institute for North Korean Studies website
 North Korean Review website
 Suk Hi Kim, Ph.D., Administrative and Faculty Bios, University of Detroit Mercy
 “Timely Book on NK Economic Sanctions.” Korea Times. 24 August 2007.

Notes

Year of birth missing (living people)
Living people
International finance economists
Pepperdine University alumni
Saint Louis University alumni
University of Detroit Mercy faculty
American writers of Korean descent